Mort Glosser Amphitheater (formerly known as the Legion Park Bowl and Gadsden Municipal Amphitheatre) is an amphitheatre in Gadsden, Alabama.  Built in 1935, it was added to the National Register of Historic Places in 1988.

History
The amphitheater was constructed in 1934–35 by the Works Progress Administration.  It was built alongside the Gadsden Municipal Auditorium along the Coosa River.  The American Legion, who owned the amphitheater, used it as a USO center during World War II to entertain soldiers stationed at Camp Sibert.  Outside of wartime, it hosted boxing matches, concerts, plays, and political rallies, among other events.  The City of Gadsden purchased the amphitheater in 1986 and began restoration of the facility.

Architecture
Designed by local architect Paul W. Hofferbert, the amphitheater was constructed using stone quarried from Lookout Mountain.  The seating area is a half-hexagon with the stage on the north end.  The stage is partially covered by a timber-frame proscenium arch finished with stone.  A club room, rectangular with a steeply pitched roof, sits to the northwest of the stage.  Entrances to the amphitheater are behind the seating area, with a hexagonal gatehouse, and a lower entrance next to the club room, accessible through a stone-walled courtyard.  The amphitheater seats 1600.

References

External links

National Register of Historic Places in Etowah County, Alabama
Theatres on the National Register of Historic Places in Alabama
Theatres completed in 1935
Buildings and structures in Gadsden, Alabama
Works Progress Administration in Alabama
Amphitheaters on the National Register of Historic Places